This is a list of flag bearers who have represented Serbia at the Olympics.

List of flag bearers 
Flag bearers carry the national flag of their country at the opening ceremony of the Olympic Games.

Key

*Previously two times the flag bearer for Serbia and Montenegro

See also
Serbia at the Olympics
List of flag bearers for Yugoslavia at the Olympics
List of flag bearers for Serbia and Montenegro at the Olympics

References

External links
 All flag bearers listed in newspaper Politika

Serbia at the Olympics
Serbia
Olympic flagbearers